was a town located in Kagoshima District, Kagoshima Prefecture, Japan.

As of 2003, the town had an estimated population of 4,504 and a density of 139.88 persons per km2. The total area was 32.20 km2.

On November 1, 2004, Sakurajima, along with the towns of Kōriyama and Matsumoto (both from Hioki District), the town of Kiire (from Ibusuki District), and the town of Yoshida (also from Kagoshima District), was merged into the expanded city of Kagoshima and no longer exists as an independent municipality.

External links
 Official website of Kagoshima in Japanese

Dissolved municipalities of Kagoshima Prefecture